Napaeus pygmaeus is a species of air-breathing land snail, a terrestrial pulmonate gastropod mollusk in the family Enidae. This species is endemic to La Gomera, in the Canary Islands.
Endemic fauna of the Canary Islands

References

Molluscs of the Canary Islands
Enidae
Gastropods described in 1993
Taxonomy articles created by Polbot